The D mesons are the lightest particle containing charm quarks. They are often studied to gain knowledge on the weak interaction.  The strange D mesons (Ds) were called "F mesons" prior to 1986.

Overview
The D mesons were discovered in 1976 by the Mark I detector at the Stanford Linear Accelerator Center.

Since the D mesons are the lightest mesons containing a single charm quark (or antiquark), they must change the charm (anti)quark into an (anti)quark of another type to decay. Such transitions involve a change of the internal charm quantum number, and can take place only via the weak interaction. In D mesons, the charm quark preferentially changes into a strange quark via an exchange of a W particle, therefore the D meson preferentially decays into kaons and pions.

List of D mesons

‡  PDG reports the resonance width  Here the conversion  is given instead.

– oscillations
In 2021 it was confirmed with a significance of more than seven standard deviations, that the neutral  meson spontaneously transforms into its own antiparticle and back. This phenomenon is called flavor oscillation and was prior known to exist in the neutral B mesons.

See also

 List of mesons
 List of particles
 Timeline of particle discoveries

References

Mesons